Crossroads (also Cross Roads) is an unincorporated community in George County, Mississippi. Its elevation is 148 feet (45 m). Prior to the creation of George County, Crossroads was located in Jackson County.

A post office operated under the name Crossroads from 1834 to 1910.

References

Unincorporated communities in George County, Mississippi
Unincorporated communities in Mississippi
Pascagoula metropolitan area